Pearl of Puerto, also referred to as Pearl of Puerto Princesa was found in the Philippine Sea by a Filipino fisherman. It measures 2.2 feet (67 cm) long, 1 foot (30 cm) wide and weighs 34 kilograms (75 lb).

History 
The pearl was found by accident by Cuyunon fishermen when they tried to pull the anchor of their ship from the seabed because of an impending storm. One of the fishermen then decided to dive to free the anchor and then found a giant clam. The fishermen thought of cooking the clam and then discovered the giant pearl. The pearl was hidden for 10 years by one of the fishermen as a token of good luck by rubbing the pearl before going out fishing. It is said that rubbing the pearl would give him a lot of fish to catch. The pearl was given to Aileen Cynthia Maggay-Amurao, a tourism officer in Puerto Princesa and relative of the fisherman. It was given since the fisherman was going to move to another place and the pearl needed safekeeping. The pearl was then displayed in Puerto Princesa where it remains to this day.

Characteristics 
The pearl has a length close to 2 feet and the weight of the pearl is close to 34 kilograms. Unlike true pearls, the Pearl of Puerto does not show iridescence. Since the pearl is bigger than the Pearl of Lao Tzu, the value of the pearl is higher. It is estimated that the pearl would cost around US $100 million.

References

External links 
 

Individual pearls
Mollusc products
Culture of Palawan
Puerto Princesa